Two Weeks in Another Town is a 1962 American drama film directed by Vincente Minnelli and starring Kirk Douglas and Edward G. Robinson. The supporting players include Cyd Charisse, Claire Trevor, Daliah Lavi, George Hamilton, and Rosanna Schiaffino. The film was based on a 1960 novel by Irwin Shaw and depicts the shooting of a romantic costume drama in Rome by a team of decadent Hollywood stars during the Hollywood on the Tiber era. The picture contains several references to The Bad and the Beautiful, a previous successful MGM movie directed by Minnelli and produced by John Houseman a decade earlier, also with a screenplay by Charles Schnee, music by David Raksin, and starring Kirk Douglas as the lead character.

The story was seen by some as a depiction of the relationships among Tyrone Power, Linda Christian and Darryl Zanuck. At the time of its release, the film was perceived as a box-office failure, with overall losses totaling approximately $3 million.

Plot
Once an established movie star, Jack Andrus has hit rock bottom. An alcoholic, he has been divorced by wife Carlotta, barely survived a car crash, and spent three years in a sanitarium recovering from a nervous breakdown.
 
Maurice Kruger, a film director who was something of a mentor to Andrus, is a has-been. However, he has landed a job in Italy, directing a movie that stars Davie Drew, a handsome, up-and-coming young actor.

Andrus is offered a chance to come to Rome and play a role in Kruger's new film. He is crestfallen upon arriving when told that the part is no longer available to him. Kruger's mean-spirited wife Clara doesn't pity him a bit, but Andrus is invited to take a lesser job assisting at Cinecittà Studio with the dubbing of the actors' lines.

While working, he socializes with the beautiful Veronica, but she actually is in love with Drew. The actor is having a great deal of difficulty with his part, and the movie is over budget and behind schedule. Kruger's stress is increased by the constant harping of Clara, resulting in a heart attack that sends the director to the hospital.

Andrus is asked to take over the director's chair and complete the film. Glad to do this favor for Kruger, he takes charge and gets the film back on schedule. The actors respond to him so much that Drew's representatives tell Andrus the actor will insist on his directing Drew's next film.

Proud of what he has done, Andrus goes to Kruger in the hospital, delighted to report the progress he's made, only to be attacked by Clara for trying to undermine Kruger and steal his movie from him. Andrus is shocked when Kruger sides with her.

An all-night descent into an alcohol-fueled rage follows. Carlotta goes along as a drunken Andrus gets behind the wheel of a car and races through the streets of Rome, nearly killing both of them.

At the last minute, Andrus comes to his senses. He vows to return home, continue his sobriety and get his life back on track.

Cast
 Kirk Douglas as Jack Andrus
 Edward G. Robinson as Maurice Kruger
 Cyd Charisse as Carlotta
 Claire Trevor as Clara Kruger
 Daliah Lavi as Veronica
 George Hamilton as Davie Drew
 Rosanna Schiaffino as Barzelli
 James Gregory as Tom Byrd
 Mino Doro as film producer Tucino

Production
Two Weeks in Another Town was created by the same team that worked on The Bad and the Beautiful: director (Vincente Minnelli), producer (John Houseman), screenwriter (Charles Schnee), composer (David Raksin), male star (Kirk Douglas), and studio (MGM). Both movies feature performances of the song "Don't Blame Me": by Leslie Uggams in Two Weeks in Another Town and by Peggy King in The Bad and the Beautiful. In one scene of the former, the cast watches clips from The Bad and the Beautiful in a screening room, presented as a movie in which Douglas's character, Jack Andrus, had starred. Two Weeks in Another Town is not a sequel, however; the characters in the two stories are unrelated.

George Hamilton was cast as "a troubled, funky James Dean-type actor, for which I couldn't have been less appropriate" as he later admitted.

In the scene where Jack Andrus searches for David Drew in nightclubs in Rome, the song is "O' Pellirossa" featuring the Italian singer and drummer Gegè Di Giacomo.

The adult subject matter ran into problems with the MPAA and the conservative studio executives at MGM. Joseph Vogel, the new studio head, wanted to transform the project into a "family film" and had it re-edited without Minnelli's input, reducing the total running time by 15 minutes. Both Minnelli and Houseman protested but to no avail. An orgy-party scene inspired by Federico Fellini's La Dolce Vita was deleted as well as a melancholy monologue by Cyd Charisse that was supposed to humanize her character. Kirk Douglas later wrote in his 1988 autobiography that "this was such an injustice to Vincente Minnelli, who'd done such a wonderful job with the film. And an injustice to the paying public, who could have had the experience of watching a very dramatic, meaningful film. They released it that way, emasculated."

The Maserati Kirk Douglas drives is a 3500 GT Spyder.

Reception

Critical
Initially, the film wasn't well-received by critics or the public. Bosley Crowther in his New York Times review of August 18, 1962 wrote: "The whole thing is a lot of glib trade patter, ridiculous and unconvincing snarls and a weird professional clash between the actor and director that is like something out of a Hollywood cartoon."

The film's reputation has greatly improved over time. David Thomson called it "underrated," writing in The New Biographical Dictionary of Film that it was "invested with such intense psychological detail that the narrative faults vanish." Jonathan Rosenbaum wrote that it was "one of [Minnelli]'s last great pictures...The costumes, decor, and 'Scope compositions show Minnelli at his most expressive, and the gaudy intensity—as well as the inside detail about the movie business—makes this compulsively watchable."

Box office
According to MGM records, the film earned $1 million in the U.S. and Canada and $1.5 million elsewhere, resulting in an overall loss of $2,969,000. Variety said it earned over $1 million in rentals in the US and Canada.

See also
 List of American films of 1962

References

External links
 
 
 
 
 

1962 films
1962 drama films
American drama films
Films directed by Vincente Minnelli
Films scored by David Raksin
Films about filmmaking
Films about Hollywood, Los Angeles
Films based on American novels
Films set in Rome
Metro-Goldwyn-Mayer films
CinemaScope films
1960s English-language films
1960s American films